Cravath is a surname. Notable people with the surname include:

Erastus Milo Cravath (1833–1900), American religious leader and educator
Gavvy Cravath (1881–1963), American baseball player
Isaac M. Cravath (1826–1872), American politician
Jeff Cravath (1903–1953) American football player and coach
Paul D. Cravath (1861–1940), American lawyer, partner at Cravath, Swaine & Moore; co-founder and a director of the Council on Foreign Relations
Prosper Cravath (1809–1886), American farmer and lawyer
Ruth Cravath (1902–1986), American stonework artist